WikiLeaks: Inside Julian Assange's War on Secrecy is a 2011 book by British journalists David Leigh and Luke Harding. It is an account of Julian Assange, WikiLeaks, and the leak by Chelsea Manning of classified material to the website in 2010. It was published by Guardian Books in February 2011.

Along with other sources, portions were adapted for the 2013 film The Fifth Estate.

Content
The book describes Assange's childhood and details about his work creating and expanding WikiLeaks. It explains how his surname comes from his stepfather, a "touring puppet theater owner", and not his biological father, a choice that Assange made himself.

Publication of the password

Wikileaks gave The Guardian a copy of the unredacted leaks which included the names of informants and other sensitive information that was not intended for publication. This very sensitive information was protected by a large passphrase to ensure its secrecy.  

However, Leigh's book then published this password which led directly to the unredacted data being publicly available. It has been claimed that this led directly to the deaths of some of those informants.

In response The Guardian said "It's nonsense to suggest the Guardian's WikiLeaks book has compromised security in any way." According to The Guardian, WikiLeaks had indicated that the password was temporary and that WikiLeaks had seven months to take action to protect the files it had subsequently decided to post online. The Guardian has not described what actions WikiLeaks could have taken given that the encrypted files had been leaked.

Wikileaks did eventually publish the unredacted version. The Guardian article about this failed to mention that the publication was after the password became widely known and was published so that informants could see what had been leaked and take action to protect themselves if necessary.

Controversies as to content
In response to the book's publication, WikiLeaks posted on Twitter: "The Guardian book serialization contains malicious libels. We will be taking action." The Hindu writer, Hasan Suroor, said Assange's concern is that the book is "critical of [Assange's] robust style and his alleged tendency to be a 'control freak'". One of the points of disagreement is that the book claimed he had initially refused to redact the names of Afghan informants to the US military from the Afghan War logs; the book reports him as saying they would "deserve it" if they were killed. When Douglas Murray relayed these comments in a debate on 9 April 2011, Assange interjected "We are in the process of suing The Guardian in relation to that comment." The Guardian claimed the following day that they had "not received any notification of such action from WikiLeaks or its lawyers", two months after the publication of the book.

References

External links
 
 
 
 
 
 
 

WikiLeaks
Works about whistleblowing
2011 non-fiction books
English non-fiction books
Biographies (books)
Guardian Books books